Michael Molo (born 7 February 1997) is a professional rugby league footballer who plays as a  for the St. George Illawarra Dragons in the NRL.

Background
Molo was born in Brisbane, Queensland. Australia. He attended Wavell State High School. He is of Samoan and Cook Islands descent and is the younger brother of Francis Molo. He is cousins with Toa Samoa captain Anthony Milford.

He played his junior football for the Aspley Devils, before being signed by the Norths Devils.

Playing career

2022 
Molo made his debut in round 11 of the 2022 NRL season for St. George Illawarra in their 24–18 victory over the New Zealand Warriors at Jubilee Oval, Molo also scored a try on debut.

Statistics

References

External links 
 Dragons profile

1997 births
Living people
Australian rugby league players
Australian sportspeople of Samoan descent
Norths Devils players
Rugby league props
Rugby league players from Brisbane
St. George Illawarra Dragons players